Ellikon may refer to several places in the canton of Zurich, Switzerland:

Ellikon an der Thur, a municipality
Ellikon am Rhein in the municipality of Marthalen